Beenish Khan is a judoka from Pakistan.

Career

National

International 
In 2009, she was part of the team sent to the first Asian Martial Arts Games held in Bangkok, Thailand. At the South Asian Games held in Guwahati, India, Khan won a silver medal in the -70 kg event. At the South Asian Games held in Kathmandu, Nepal in December 2019, she won a bronze medal in the 78+kg event. Alongside her teammates: Hamid Ali, Shah Hussain Shah, Qaiser Khan, Karamat Butt, Mohammad Hasnain, Nadeem Akram, Amina Toyoda, Humaira Ashiq and Asma Rani she also won a silver medal in the mixed team event.

Events participated in

 Commonwealth Judo Championships: 2018
 South Asian Games: 2016, 2019

References 

Living people
South Asian Games silver medalists for Pakistan
South Asian Games bronze medalists for Pakistan
South Asian Games medalists in judo
Year of birth missing (living people)